"All the Good Ones Are Gone" is a song written by Dean Dillon and Bob McDill, and recorded by American country music artist Pam Tillis.  It was released in April 1997 as the first single from her Greatest Hits compilation album.  The song reached #4 on the Billboard Hot Country Singles & Tracks chart.

Chart performance

Year-end charts

References

1997 singles
1997 songs
Pam Tillis songs
Songs written by Dean Dillon
Songs written by Bob McDill
Song recordings produced by Billy Joe Walker Jr.
Arista Nashville singles